Ngoy Nsumbu (born 30 December 1972) is a retired Congolese football midfielder. He was a squad member at the 1994 Africa Cup of Nations.

Honours
Genk
Belgian First Division: 1998–99
Belgian Cup: 1997–98

References

1972 births
Living people
Democratic Republic of the Congo footballers
Association football midfielders
Beerschot A.C. players
K.S.V. Waregem players
Royal Cappellen F.C. players
K.R.C. Genk players
K.F.C. Verbroedering Geel players
Maccabi Petah Tikva F.C. players
Belgian Pro League players
Israeli Premier League players
1994 African Cup of Nations players
Expatriate footballers in Belgium
Expatriate footballers in Israel
Democratic Republic of the Congo expatriate sportspeople in Belgium
Democratic Republic of the Congo expatriate sportspeople in Israel
Democratic Republic of the Congo international footballers
Democratic Republic of the Congo expatriate footballers